{{DISPLAYTITLE:C17H19N}}
The molecular formula C17H19N (molar mass: 237.34 g/mol, exact mass: 237.1517 u) may refer to:

 CP-39,332
 2-Diphenylmethylpyrrolidine (Desoxy-D2PM)
 Etifelmine
 Tametraline (CP-24,441)

Molecular formulas